Centro may refer to:

Places

Brazil
Centro, Santa Maria, a neighborhood in Santa Maria, Rio Grande do Sul, Brazil
Centro, Porto Alegre, a neighborhood of Porto Alegre, Rio Grande do Sul, Brazil
Centro (Duque de Caxias), a neighborhood of Duque de Caxias, Rio de Janeiro, Brazil
, a neighborhood of Niterói, Rio de Janeiro, Brazil
Centro, Rio de Janeiro, a neighborhood of Rio de Janeiro, Brazil
Centro (São Paulo), the historic downtown of São Paulo, Brazil
, Aracaju, Sergipe, Brazil

Mexico
Centro, Guadalajara, Jalisco, Mexico
Centro, Puerto Vallarta, Jalisco, Mexico
Centro Municipality, Tabasco, Mexico
Centro (borough), Tijuana, Baja California, Mexico
Centro, Yucatán, Mexico
Centro, the historic center of Mexico City, Mexico

Elsewhere
Centro Habana, Cuba
Centro, Mandaue, a barangay in the Philippines
Centro Region, Portugal
Centro, Moca, Puerto Rico, a subdivision (also called a barrio) of Moca, Puerto Rico
Centro (Madrid), a district of the city of Madrid, Spain
Centro (Málaga), a district of the city of Málaga, Andalusia, Spain
Centro, Montevideo, downtown barrio of Montevideo, Uruguay

Transport 
Centro, the Central New York Regional Transportation Authority in the United States 
Plaxton Centro, a bus body built by Plaxton in the UK
West Midlands Passenger Transport Executive, formerly named Centro, the body formerly responsible for public transport in the county of West Midlands, England

Other 
CentrO, a shopping mall in Oberhausen, Germany
Centro Tampa, a Spanish-language newspaper in Tampa, Florida, USA
Palm Centro
Vicinity Centres, a retail property developer formerly trading as Centro Property Group

See also 
 El Centro (disambiguation)
 Centro Direzionale (disambiguation)
 Central District (disambiguation)